The canton of Sedan-1 is an administrative division of the Ardennes department, northern France. It was created at the French canton reorganisation which came into effect in March 2015. Its seat is in Sedan.

It consists of the following communes:

Cheveuges
Donchery
Noyers-Pont-Maugis
Saint-Aignan
Sedan (partly)
Thelonne
Villers-sur-Bar
Vrigne-aux-Bois
Wadelincourt

References

Cantons of Ardennes (department)